Hutchinson Island is a river island in the Savannah River, north of downtown Savannah in Chatham County, Georgia, United States. The island is formed where the Back River breaks off to the north from the Savannah River. Historically, Hutchinson Island's land use has been primarily industrial, much of which supported the Port of Savannah, one of the busiest containerization cargo ports in the world.

History
The island was named after Archibald Hutchinson, an acquaintance of General Oglethorpe.

It played a major role in the capture of Savannah during the American Civil War. After capturing Atlanta, Union Gen. William Tecumseh Sherman turned his army east and south, toward the Atlantic Ocean, and arrived in Savannah in December 1864. Rather than destroying Savannah, Sherman elected to demand the city's surrender. Confederate Gen. William J. Hardee led his troops, under cover of darkness, across the Savannah River on a makeshift pontoon bridge, across Hutchinson Island and into the South Carolina wilderness.

On the Back River, the U.S. Army Corps of Engineers formerly maintained a tidal control system that slowed the natural filling-in of the main river's shipping channel. The tide gate was abandoned after studies showed that it had increased saltwater intrusion into the upriver freshwater Savannah National Wildlife Refuge.

Facilities

Chatham County voters approved spending $63 million in public special-purpose local-option sales tax money for the trade center and $10 million for the road system on the island. The Savannah International Trade and Convention Center and the Westin Savannah Harbor Resort were built. In addition, the state of Georgia provided $18 million, and former land owner CSX railroad donated  for the public trade center.

While much of Hutchinson Island has been trade convention and resort-oriented in the past, the island's first residential community is under way, The Reserve at Savannah Harbor, and plans are being drawn to develop the riverfront into a mixed-use, urban extension of Savannah.

The Georgia Ports Authority and International Paper still own undeveloped tracts of land on the far west end of Hutchinson Island.

Grand Prize of America Road Course

In the 1990s, a group of local businessmen formed the Colonial Motorsport company, deciding it was time to bring back international racing action to Savannah. Major international races had last been held on the streets of Savannah with the American Grand Prize in 1908, 1910, and 1911; and the Vanderbilt Cup Race in 1911. After four years of careful negotiations, an agreement was reached for a stand-alone race of the then PPG/Firestone Indy Lights series in 1997, with follow up events in '98 and '99 offering the possibility of a future CART round. Public monies helped build a 1.965-mile county road to serve as a 10-turn circuit; the first time a public road had been pre-designed with the intention of also using it for racing in the USA. 
In May 1997 the inaugural Dixie Crystals Grand Prix was held, with support races for the North American Touring Car Championship, Barber Dodge Pro Series, and the U.S. F2000 National Championship. Before of a race day crowd of over 30,000, future Indianapolis 500 winner, Hélio Castroneves, won the race.

Mark Blundell quoted, after a feasibility test for future CART races, "As a drivers track, it's good, It's quite demanding and really physical. It's a fun circuit to drive, and there are at least two and possibly three spots for overtaking. It doesn't have a street course feel, it's more of a road course feel. From a spectator viewpoint, there are plenty of great vantage points."

The event looked like a modest success; drivers seemed happy with the course, fans turned out in reasonable numbers, and a contract was in place for future years. However, creditors and several companies involved in the construction didn't want to give the promoters a reasonable time frame to make the event profitable. The resulting lawsuit threw Colonial Motorsport company into Chapter 11, and all its contracts, including the one with CART, were dissolved. The track itself came into public ownership and fell into disrepair.

In the 2010s the track was reworked and reopened for historic racing.  Historic Sportscar Racing (HSR) has been sanctioning the Savannah Speed Classic, part of the Hilton Head Island Motoring Festival & Concours d'Elegance, taking place the last weekend of October (in Savannah) through the first weekend in November (in Hilton Head Island) each year.

In July 2021, the organizers of the Savannah Speed Classic, Hilton Head Island Concours d’Elegance, cancelled the 2021 event. With construction work encroaching on the south west portion of Grand Prize of America Ave (the track's turn 8) forcing the guardrail to be removed, organizers had significant concerns about the ability to provide a safe venue for competitors, spectators, volunteers and on-site management. There are currently no plans to bring with Savannah Speed Classic back.

Access
Ferry boats take visitors and residents across the Savannah River on a regular, daily schedule. The island can also be accessed by car from the south, via the Talmadge Memorial Bridge, and from the north, in South Carolina, via U.S. Highway 17.

References

Islands of Chatham County, Georgia
Islands of Georgia (U.S. state)